Jamaica is a nation in the Caribbean Sea.

Jamaica may also refer to:

Places

In the United States
 Jamaica, Georgia
 Jamaica, Illinois
 Jamaica, Iowa
 Jamaica, Queens, New York City
 Jamaica Avenue, a street in Queens, New York City
 Jamaica, Vermont, a New England town
 Jamaica (CDP), Vermont, the central village in the town
 Jamaica, Virginia
 Jamaica Beach, Texas
 Jamaica Plain, Massachusetts

In Cuba
 Jamaica, Cuba, Guantánamo Province
 Jamaica, Mayabeque

In Mexico
Mercado Jamaica, Mexico City (Jamaica Market)

People
 Jamaica Kincaid, African American author

Arts, entertainment and media
 Jamaica (novel), a novel by Malcolm Knox
 Giamaica or "Jamaica", recorded by several Italian artists
 "Jamaica" (song), a song by Bachman–Turner Overdrive
 "D'yer Mak'er", a song by Led Zeppelin - pronounced "Jamaica"
 Jamaica (musical), a musical by  Harold Arlen and EY Harburg

Rail transport
 45612 Jamaica, a British LMS Jubilee Class locomotive
 BMT Jamaica Line, a New York City Subway line
 Jamaica Center–Parsons/Archer (Archer Avenue Lines), a New York City Subway station complex at Parsons Boulevard and Archer Avenue consisting of:
Jamaica Center–Parsons/Archer (BMT Archer Avenue Line); serving the  
Jamaica Center–Parsons/Archer (IND Archer Avenue Line); serving the 
 Jamaica (LIRR station), a station on the Long Island Rail Road and AirTrain JFK
 Jamaica–179th Street (IND Queens Boulevard Line), a New York City Subway station at Hillside Avenue and 179th Street serving the 
 Jamaica–Van Wyck (IND Archer Avenue Line), a New York City Subway station at Jamaica Avenue and Van Wyck Expressway serving the 
 Jamaica metro station, a station in Mexico City
 The Jamaica, a caboose owned by Sir John A. Macdonald

Ships
 , a cruiser of the Royal Navy
 SS Jamaica, a United Fruit Company turbo-electric liner that was commissioned into the US Navy as 
 , an escort carrier of the US Navy

Other uses
 Jamaica (drink), a hibiscus tea drink popular in Mexico
 Jamaica coalition (politics), German political term